The Southern Rhodesian Liberal Party was a political party in Southern Rhodesia, founded in 1943 by Jacob Smit (1881–1959), the former United Party (UP) Minister of Finance. It is thought that Smit split from the UP largely because Prime Minister Sir Godfrey Martin Huggins had failed to include him in the exclusive Second World War Defence Committee.

In his A History of Rhodesia, Robert Blake writes that Smit's party, "in accordance with the Rhodesian tradition of adopting the most misleading political nomenclature possible, called themselves 'Liberals.'" The party was, in fact, pronouncedly illiberal, and attempted to unite conservative, non-trade union opposition to the UP while opposing government economic regulation and the advancement of Black political interests. The Liberal Party did well in the 1946 general election, winning 12 out of 30 seats in the Southern Rhodesia Legislative Assembly, but in the 1948 general election it won only five seats and its support declined subsequently. It was to become one of the political precursors to the future Rhodesian Front (RF) party.

See also
 United Federal Party

References
References

Bibliography

1943 establishments in Southern Rhodesia
Conservative parties in Zimbabwe
Defunct political parties in Zimbabwe
Political parties in Rhodesia
Political parties established in 1943
Protestant political parties
White nationalism in Zimbabwe
White nationalist parties